This is a list of settlements in the Florina regional unit, Greece.

 Achlada
 Aetos
 Agia Paraskevi
 Agios Achilleios
 Agios Germanos
 Agios Panteleimonas
 Agios Vartholomaios
 Agrapidies
 Akritas
 Alona
 Ammochori
 Amyntaio
 Anargyroi
 Ano Kalliniki
 Ano Kleines
 Ano Ydroussa
 Antartiko
 Antigonos
 Armenochori
 Asprogeia
 Atrapos
 Drosopigi
 Ethniko
 Fanos
 Farangi
 Filotas
 Flampouro
 Florina
 Itea
 Kallithea
 Karyes
 Kato Kalliniki
 Kella
 Kladorrachi
 Kleidi
 Kolchiki
 Koryfi
 Kotas
 Kratero
 Krystallopigi
 Laimos
 Lechovo
 Lefkonas
 Leptokaryes
 Levaia
 Limnochori
 Lofoi
 Maniaki
 Marina
 Meliti
 Mesochori
 Mesokampos
 Mesonisi
 Mikrolimni
 Neochoraki
 Neos Kafkasos
 Niki
 Nymfaio
 Palaistra
 Pappagiannis
 Paroreio
 Pedino
 Pelargos
 Petres
 Pisoderi
 Platy
 Polyplatano
 Polypotamo
 Prasino
 Proti
 Psarades
 Rodonas
 Sitaria
 Sklithro
 Skopia
 Skopos
 Triantafyllia
 Tripotamos
 Trivouno
 Valtonera
 Variko
 Vatochori
 Vegora
 Vevi
 Vrontero
 Xino Nero
 Ydroussa

By municipality

See also

List of towns and villages in Greece

Florina
Communities